Abell 2162 is a galaxy cluster in the Abell catalogue located in the constellation Corona Borealis. It is a member of the Hercules Superclusters, the redshifts of the member galaxies of which lie between 0.0304 and 0.0414. The cluster hosts a massive Type-cD galaxy called NGC 6086.

See also
 Abell catalogue
 List of Abell clusters
 X-ray astronomy

References

Further reading
 

 
2162
Galaxy clusters
Corona Borealis
Hercules Superclusters